Deganit Berest (born 1949 in Petah Tikva) is an Israeli painter and photographer.

Berest is a conceptual artist who employs processes of disassembly, projection, screening and enlargement to turn the everyday into something wondrous and odd.  
She is best known for her painting David and I (1973-1974) and Piano Line (1986-1987).

Berest was a recipient of the Sandberg Prize in 1993, the Dizengoff Prize in 2007, and the Rappaport Prize for Established Israeli Artist in 2012.

See also
Visual arts in Israel

References

External links
 That is to say: On the Art of Deganit Berest, edited by: Efrat Biberman

1949 births
Living people
Israeli painters
Israeli photographers